The Moreno Hill Formation is a geological formation in western New Mexico whose strata were deposited in the Late Cretaceous. Dinosaur remains are among the fossils that have been recovered from the formation.

Description
The formation is a nonmarine coal-bearing formation composed mostly of sandstone and shale with minor siltstone. The shales are brownish gray in color, and the sandstones are discontinuous beds of very pale orange to light brown poorly sorted grains that usually show steep crossbedding. The sandstones are interpreted as channel or splay deposits in a fluvial environment. The shales include thin lenses of bituminous coal, including tonsteins (distinctive thin ash beds). It overlies the Atarque Sandstone and is in turn overlain by the Fence Lake Formation.

The formation is laterally equivalent to the Tres Hermanos Formation, Pescado Tongue of the Mancos Shale, Gallup Sandstone, and lower Crevasse Canyon Formation. It represents beds southwest of the pinchout of the Pescado Tongue where the Tres Hermanos Formation and Gallup Sandstone are no longer lithologically distinguishable.

Vertebrate paleofauna
The Moreno Hill Formation was originally thought to be devoid of fossils, but it has since yielded a diverse vertebrate paleofauna.

Fish

Dinosaurs

Testudines

History of investigation
The formation was first named by McLellan and coinvestigators in 1983 for exposures around Moreno Hill in the Salt Lake coal field of western New Mexico. The beds were originally mapped as Mesaverde Group, but were found to be much lower in the stratigraphic column.

See also

 List of dinosaur-bearing rock formations

References

Cretaceous formations of New Mexico
Turonian Stage